The 1957 Baylor Bears football team represented Baylor University in the 1957 NCAA University Division football season. The team finished with a record of 3-6-1. Clyde Letbetter (Guard) was chosen as an All-Southwest Conference player.

Schedule

References

Baylor
Baylor Bears football seasons
Baylor Bears football